This is a list of San Francisco Designated Landmarks. In 1967, the city of San Francisco, California adopted Article 10 of the Planning Code, providing the city with the authority to designate and protect landmarks from inappropriate alterations.  As of February 2019, the city has designated 288 structures or other properties as San Francisco Designated Landmarks. Many of the properties have also received recognition at the federal level by inclusion on the National Register of Historic Places or by designation as National Historic Landmarks.

Color markings (highest noted listing)

San Francisco Designated Landmarks

San Francisco Landmark Districts
Since 1972, the City of San Francisco has designated thirteen local landmark districts ranging in size from a handful of buildings to several hundred properties. Landmark districts are regulated by Article 10 of the Planning Code.

See also

 California Historical Landmarks in San Francisco County, California
 National Register of Historic Places listings in San Francisco

References

External links

 San Francisco Planning Department - Historic Preservation
 Locally Designated San Francisco Landmarks
 State Designated San Francisco Landmarks

 
Locally designated landmarks in the United States

Landmarks
Lists of places in California
Heritage registers in California